Wask'aqucha (Quechua wask'a rectangle / long, qucha lake, "rectangle lake" or "long lake", hispanicized spelling Huascacocha) is a lake in Peru. It is located in the Apurímac Region, Abancay Province, Circa District.

See also 
 Qiwllaqucha

References 

Lakes of Peru
Lakes of Apurímac Region